Francis Henry Wollaston Sheppard (10 September 1921 – 22 January 2018) was a historian of London and topographical writer who was responsible for many of the volumes in the Survey of London. He was described by Andrew Saint as "London's greatest topographical writer since John Stow".

Selected publications
 Local Government in Marylebone 1688–1835 (1958)
 London 1808–1870: The Infernal Wen (1971)
 The Treasury of London's Past (1991)
 London: A History (1998)

See also
 Harold James Dyos

References 

1921 births
2018 deaths
Historians of London
British non-fiction writers
Councillors in Oxfordshire
Mayors of places in Oxfordshire
People from Henley-on-Thames